Bo Stefan Jansson (born 20 May 1970) is a Swedish retired footballer.

Jansson joined Djurgården from IFK Hässleholm for the 1995 Allsvenskan season, playing 2 Allsvenskan matches and scoring 0 goals during the season.

References

Swedish footballers
1970 births
Living people
Association football midfielders
Västerås SK Fotboll players
Pogoń Szczecin players
IFK Hässleholm players
Djurgårdens IF Fotboll players
Chengdu Tiancheng F.C. players
Expatriate footballers in Poland